Udo Guse (born 23 September 1967) is a German former weightlifter. He competed in the men's heavyweight I event at the 1992 Summer Olympics.

References

External links
 

1967 births
Living people
German male weightlifters
Olympic weightlifters of Germany
Weightlifters at the 1992 Summer Olympics
People from Stralsund
Sportspeople from Mecklenburg-Western Pomerania
20th-century German people